Lonesome Corners is a 1922 American silent comedy drama film directed by Edgar Jones and starring Jones, Henry Van Bousen and Lillian Lorraine.

Plot

Henry Warburon (portrayed by Henry Van Bousen) is a wilderness dweller; his wife, Nola Warburton (portrayed by Edna May Sperl) is a taciturn individual, devoid of any social graces and refinement. A friend, Grant Hamilton (portrayed by Edgar Jones), recruits a chaperone to assist him in kidnapping Nola and together, the two attempt to tutor her in efforts to improve her deportment. While his wife is missing, Henry receives frequent correspondence describing his improvements in his wife's attitude and mannerisms. He attempts to locate his wife, but his efforts are unsuccessful.

In the final letter Henry receives, he is notified that he has become a father. One year later, Henry travels to New York to claim an inheritance and is reunited with Nola, who is markedly refined, and eager to become the perfect consort for her now-wealthy husband.

Cast
 Edgar Jones as Grant Hamilton
 Henry Van Bousen as Henry Warburon
 Edna May Sperl as Nola
 Walter P. Lewis as Jake Fowler 
 Lillian Lorraine as Martha Forrest

References

Bibliography
 Lynn Kear and James King. Evelyn Brent: The Life and Films of Hollywood's Lady Crook. McFarland, 2009.

External links
 

1920s American films
1922 films
1922 comedy films
1920s English-language films
American silent feature films
Silent American comedy films
American black-and-white films
Films directed by Edgar Jones
Pathé Exchange films